Macrotristria is a genus of cicada in the cryptotympanini tribe of the Cicadinae subfamily. Twenty five species are listed in the Atlas of Living Australia.

Species
Macrotristria douglasi Burns, 1964
Macrotristria maculicollis Ashton, 1914
Macrotristria dorsalis Ashton, 1912
Macrotristria thopoides Ashton, 1914
Macrotristria kulungra Burns, 1964
Macrotristria frenchi Ashton, 1914
Macrotristria extrema (Distant, 1892)
Macrotristria lachlani Moulds, 1992
Macrotristria bindalia Burns, 1964
Macrotristria worora Burns, 1964
Macrotristria kabikabia Burns, 1964
Macrotristria vittata Moulds, 1992
Macrotristria hieroglyphicalis (Kirkaldy, 1909)
Macrotristria doddi Ashton, 1912
Macrotristria angularis (Germar, 1834) - cherrynose
Macrotristria godingi Distant, 1907 - tiger prince
Macrotristria sylvara (Distant, 1901) - northern cherrynose
Macrotristria intersecta (Walker, 1850) - corroboree cicada
Macrotristria hillieri Distant, 1907 accepted name - Parnquila hillieri
Macrotristria vulpina Ashton, 1914 accepted name - Burbunga aterrima
Macrotristria aterrima Distant, 1914 accepted name - Burbunga aterrima
Macrotristria nanda Burns, 1964 accepted name - Burbunga nanda
Macrotristria nigrosignata Distant, 1904 accepted name - Burbunga nigrosignata
Macrotristria occidentalis Distant, 1912 accepted name - Burbunga occidentalis
Macrotristria nigronervosa Distant, 1904 accepted name - Macrotristria sylvara

References

Macrotristriini
Cicadidae genera